This is a list of peoples who inhabited Anatolia in antiquity. The essential purpose of the list is to identify prehistoric cultures in the region but many of the peoples continued to inhabit Anatolia into and through classical and late antiquity, so the actual scope of the list encompasses the history of Anatolia from prehistory to the Eastern Roman Empire (4th to 7th centuries AD), during which transition to the early medieval occurred.

Anatolia was inhabited by numerous races and its history is characterised by folk movement and migration. Broadly, the peoples can be split linguistically between those who spoke a proto-Indo-European language, such as proto-Anatolian or proto-Greek, and those who spoke a language outside of the Indo-European family such as Kartvelian or Kaskian. The Indo-Europeans are further sub-divided into those who may be termed Anatolian natives and those whose origins were elsewhere. Native Anatolians included the Hittites, Luwians and the Lydians; incoming races included the Armenians, Greeks, Phrygians and Thracians.

Indo-European peoples

Anatolian peoples (Anatolian Indo-European)

Hittites
Cappadocians? / Leucosyri? (Cappadocians and Leucosyri were the same people; Cappadocians was the Persian name and Leukosyroi the Greek name, Leucosyri is the Latin name based on Greek) (Cappadocians also inhabited the West Pontus that originally was part of Cappadocia)
Amiseni? (inhabited Themiscyra district in West Pontus)
Kases? / Cases?
Cataonians?

Luwians
Carians
Cilicians
Commagenians?
Isaurians
Leleges?
Lycaonians
Lycians
Philistines? - notably inhabited Palestine; their inclusion here is tenuous as they may have had an Anatolian origin
Pisidians / Pamphylians (Pamphylians, on the coast, and Pisidians, in the inland, were the same people and spoke the same language, the difference was that Anatolian Pamphylians were more Greek influenced since Iron Age) (there was an Anatolian Pamphylian dialect, part of the Pisidian language, and a Pamphylian Greek dialect, part of Ancient Greek, depending on the degree of Hellenization)
Homanades (Homana or Homona was their main settlement)
Sidians
Solymoi / Solymi
Milyans / Milyae
Telchines?
Western Anatolian

 Lydians
 Kaystrianoi / Caystriani
Kilbianoi / Cilbiani

 Trojans

Palaic peoples
Paphlagonians?
Caucones? / Kaukauni?
Heneti?
Mariandyni?
Possible Anatolian (Indo-European) peoples
Mysians? (possibly they were more related to the Phrygians, a non Anatolian Indo-European people, and therefore they were possibly not an Anatolian Indo-European people, Mysia was also known as Phrygia Hellespontica, however they probably had a mixing with an Anatolian people closer to the Lydians that would explain contradictory statements by ancient authors)
Milatai? / Milatae?
Isuwans? (seem to have been a mixed Anatolian, Hurrian, and Mitanni population)

Armenians

Celts

Galatians
Tectosages 
Tolistobogii / Tolistobogioi
Trocmi / Trokmoi
Aigosages, between Troy and Cyzicus
Daguteni, in modern Marmara region around Orhaneli
Inovanteni, east of the Trocnades
Okondiani, between Phrygia and Galatia northeast of modern Akşehir Gölü
Rigosages, unlocated

Greeks
Central-Eastern Greeks
Central Greeks
Aeolians
Eastern Greeks
Achaeans (possible inhabitants of a land called Ahhiyawa by the Hittites)
Ionians
Western Greeks
Dorians

Phrygians
Kaourkoi / Caurci?
Fontes?

Mysians 
Mysians (possibly they were more related to the Phrygians, a non Anatolian Indo-European people, and therefore they were possibly not an Anatolian Indo-European people, Mysia was also known as Phrygia Hellespontica, however they probably had a mixing with an Anatolian people closer to the Lydians that would explain contradictory statements by ancient authors)
Milatai? / Milatae?

Thracians

Bithynians

Thynians

Possible Indo-European peoples

Hayasa-Azzi
Hayasans (Proto-Armenians?)
Azzians (Proto-Armenians?)

Mushki
Mushki
Western Mushki (synonymous of the Phrygians? and related Mysians?)
Eastern Mushki (Proto-Armenians?)
Moschi-Mossynoeci
Moschi (possible Mushki, Indo-European?, origin, assimilated by old Kartvelian peoples and named Meskhetians, the inhabitants of Meskheti in far southwestern Georgia - Sakartvelo)
Mossynoeci (possible Mushki, Indo-European?, origin, assimilated by old Kartvelian peoples and named Meskhetians, the inhabitants of Meskheti in far southwestern Georgia - Sakartvelo)

Urumu
Urumu (Proto-Armenians?), allied with Mushki and Kaskians, possibly Arimi of Greek sources and Arme/Urme/Armini of Urartian sources

Tibareni
Tibareni (several Classical Antiquity authors such as Herodotus, Xenophon and Strabo believed that they were of Scythian origin)

Diauehi
Mentioned by Assyrians as one of the Nairi tribes inhabiting the Palu or Mush regions, later mentioned by Urartians in the vicinity of Kars Province, probably the Taochoi of Greek sources

Non-Indo-European peoples

Kartvelians

Colchians  
Byzeres (The name of the historical region Odzrkhe is derived from the name of this tribe - Vidzerukh / Viterukh / Odzr(a)khe / Odzrkhe)
Drilae / Sanni
Drilae (according to Arrian, Drilae and Sanni were the same people) (ancestors of present-day Zans)
Sanni (ancestors of present-day Zans)
Machelones-Macrones
Machelones (closely related to the Macrones)
Macrones (ancestors of present-day Mingrelians) 
Marres
Phasians
Zydretae

Possible Kartvelian peoples

Eastern Mushki
Moschi-Mossynoeci
Moschi (possible Mushki, Kartvelian?, origin, and named Meskhetians, the inhabitants of Meskheti in far southwestern Georgia - Sakartvelo)
Mossynoeci (possible Mushki, Kartvelian?, origin, and named Meskhetians, the inhabitants of Meskheti in far southwestern Georgia - Sakartvelo)

Tibareni 
Tibareni (several Classical Antiquity authors such as Herodotus, Xenophon and Strabo believed that they were of Scythian origin)

Hurrians
Mitanni (seem to have been Hurrian with an Indo-Aryan ruling class)
Isuwans (seem to have been a mixed Anatolian, Hurrian, and Mitanni population)
Kizzuwatnans
Urartu (predecessors of the Armenians, they spoke a laguage similar to Hurrians)

Linguistically unclassified peoples

Hattians
The Hattians occupied the land of Hatti in central Anatolia and are documented at least as early as the empire of Sargon of Akkad (c. 2300 BC). Possibly connected to Northwest Caucasians.

Kaskians
Possibly connected to Hattians and/or Northwest Caucasians.

See also
List of ancient peoples of Italy
Ancient regions of Anatolia

References

Further reading
 

Anatolia